The John Henry Clayborn House is a historic house at 1800 Marshall Street in Little Rock, Arkansas.  It is a two-story structure, built out of wood framing reinforced with concrete, with its exterior finished in brick.  Its front façade is symmetrical, with the center entrance flanked by banks of three windows, topped by a shed roof that continues to the side, where it forms a gable.  Built in 1932, the house is noted for its association with Bishop John Henry Clayborn, a leading advocate of education, spiritual development, and civil rights of African Americans in Arkansas.

The house was listed on the National Register of Historic Places in 2006.

See also
National Register of Historic Places listings in Little Rock, Arkansas

References

Houses on the National Register of Historic Places in Arkansas
Houses in Little Rock, Arkansas
National Register of Historic Places in Little Rock, Arkansas
Historic district contributing properties in Arkansas